KDEO-LD, virtual channel 23 (UHF digital channel 21), is a low-powered television station licensed to Denver, Colorado, United States. The station is owned by Simchat Torah Beit Midrash.

In 2015, the Catholic Television Apostolate sold KDEO-LD and three associated low-power TV stations in Colorado Springs, Pueblo, and Fort Collins to Simchat Torah Beit Midrash for $800,000.

References

External links

DEO-LD
Television channels and stations established in 1989
1989 establishments in Colorado
Low-power television stations in the United States